The 2011 Rochester mayoral special election took place on March 29, 2011 in the city of Rochester, New York, United States. Thomas Richards was elected over former mayor William A. Johnson Jr. to serve for the remainder of the term.

Background

Incumbent Democratic Thomas Richards had been sworn in as interim mayor after Robert Duffy was elected lieutenant governor in 2010, previously having served as the City of Rochester Corporation Counsel and subsequently deputy mayor. There was some controversy about whether Richards was officially mayor, or whether the power appointing a new mayor rested solely with the City Council. The council decided to hold a special election rather than wait for a general election to be held in November. The immediacy of the election precluded the possibility of primaries, so candidates were chosen directly by the party leaders. Having decided to contest the special election for the rest of Duffy's term, Richards resigned to ensure he could run without violating terms of the Hatch Act, which could have jeopardized federal funding.

Candidates

Democratic
Thomas Richards - interim mayor

Working Families
William A. Johnson Jr. - former mayor

Independence
William A. Johnson Jr.

Green
Alex White - businessman

Results

References

Rochester
Mayoral elections in Rochester, New York
Rochester
Rochester 2011
Rochester 2011
Rochester